The 71st annual Cannes Film Festival was held from 8 to 19 May 2018. Australian actress Cate Blanchett acted as President of the Jury. The Japanese film Shoplifters, directed by Hirokazu Kore-eda, won the Palme d'Or.

Asghar Farhadi's psychological thriller Everybody Knows, starring Javier Bardem, Penélope Cruz and Ricardo Darín, opened the festival and competed in the Main Competition section. It was the second Spanish-language film to open Cannes, following Pedro Almodóvar's Bad Education, which screened on the opening night of the 2004 festival.

The official festival poster features Jean-Paul Belmondo and Anna Karina from Jean-Luc Godard's 1965 film Pierrot le Fou. It is the second time the festival poster was inspired by Godard's film after his 1963 film Contempt at the 2016 festival. According to festival's official statement, the poster is inspired by and paid tribute to the work of French photographer Georges Pierre.

Juries

Main competition

Cate Blanchett, Australian actress, Jury President
Chang Chen, Taiwanese actor
Ava DuVernay, American director
Robert Guédiguian, French director
Khadja Nin, Burundian singer-songwriter
Léa Seydoux, French actress
Kristen Stewart, American actress
Denis Villeneuve, Canadian director
Andrey Zvyagintsev, Russian director

Un Certain Regard
Benicio del Toro, Puerto Rican actor, Jury President
Kantemir Balagov, Russian director
Julie Huntsinger, American executive director of the Telluride Film Festival
Annemarie Jacir, Palestinian writer and director
Virginie Ledoyen, French Actress

Camera d'Or
Ursula Meier, Swiss film director, Jury President
Marie Amachoukeli, French director
Iris Brey, French-American critic, director and writer
Sylvain Fage, French president of Cinéphase
Jeanne Lapoirie, French cinematographer
Arnaud and Jean-Marie Larrieu, French directors and writers

Cinéfondation and short films
Bertrand Bonello, French film director, Jury President
Valeska Grisebach, German film director
Khalil Joreige, Lebanese artist and film director
Alantė Kavaitė, French-Lithuanian film director
Ariane Labed, French actress

Independent juries
International Critics' Week
Joachim Trier, Norwegian film director, Jury President
Chloë Sevigny, American actress and film director
Nahuel Pérez Biscayart, Argentinian actor
Eva Sangiorgi, Italian director of the Vienna International Film Festival
Augustin Trapenard, French culture journalist

L'Œil d'or
Emmanuel Finkiel, French director, Jury President
Lolita Chammah, French actress
Isabelle Danel, French critic
Kim Longinotto, British documentary filmmaker
Paul Sturtz, American director of the True/False Film Festival

Official selection

In competition
The following films were selected to compete for the Palme d'Or:

(CdO) indicates film eligible for the Caméra d'Or as a feature directorial debut.
(QP) indicates film in competition for the Queer Palm.

Un Certain Regard
The following films were selected to compete in the Un Certain Regard section:

(CdO) indicates film eligible for the Caméra d'Or as a feature directorial debut.
(QP) indicates film in competition for the Queer Palm.

Out of competition
The following films were selected to be screened out of competition:

(CdO) indicates film eligible for the Caméra d'Or as a feature directorial debut.
(QP) indicates film in competition for the Queer Palm.

Special screenings
The following films were selected be shown in the special screenings section:

(ŒdO) indicates film eligible for the Œil d'or for documentary feature.

Cannes Classics
The full line-up for the Cannes Classics section was announced on 23 April 2018.

Restorations

Documentaries

(ŒdO) indicates film eligible for the Œil d'or as documentary.

Cinéma de la Plage
The Cinéma de la Plage is a part of the Official Selection of the festival. The outdoors screenings at the beach cinema of Cannes are open to the public.

Parallel sections

International Critics' Week
The following films were selected for the International Critics' Week section:

(CdO) indicates film eligible for the Caméra d'Or as a feature directorial debut.
(QP) indicates film in competition for the Queer Palm.

Shorts

Directors' Fortnight
The following films were selected to be screened in the Directors' Fortnight section:

Features 

(CdO) indicates film eligible for the Caméra d'Or as a feature directorial debut.
(QP) indicates film in competition for the Queer Palm.

Shorts

ACID

(QP) indicates film in competition for the Queer Palm.

In the news

Netflix films 
A ban on Netflix films in competition, which came about after the streaming giant refused to show them in French cinemas, has meant the issues of streaming and distribution have also been hot topics. The issue prompted Juror Ava DuVernay, who made 13th for Netflix, to make a plea for "flexibility of thought".

In March and April 2018, weeks before general delegate Thierry Frémaux was set to unveil the official selection, reports suggested streaming service Netflix was to pull its already-selected films from premiering at the festival in retaliation for the barring of Netflix films from competing. They were still allowed to premiere in other sections, and many reportedly opted for an Out of Competition berth. The films affected were Alfonso Cuarón's Roma, Morgan Neville's They'll Love Me When I'm Dead, Orson Welles' final film The Other Side of the Wind, Paul Greengrass' Norway, and Jeremy Saulnier's Hold the Dark.

Ultimately, Netflix pulled all of their films from selection. Notably, in the press conference announcement, Frémaux commented that he wanted The Other Side of the Wind and had planned to screen it as a special screening with the Welles-related documentary They'll Love Me When I'm Dead. He also noted that he had selected Roma for competition.

Lars von Trier 
Danish film director Lars von Trier returned to Cannes with his film The House That Jack Built, after he was declared "persona non grata" at the 2011 festival.

Gender equality 
The chair of the jury Cate Blanchett has called for gender parity at the Cannes Film Festival, calling it "almost a gladiatorial sport". However, she concedes that there has been improvements and the change "won't happen overnight".

During the festival, 82 female film professionals, led by Jury president Cate Blanchett and veteran director Agnès Varda, took part to a demonstration on the red carpet, demanding more equality between men and women in the film industry, notably the end of the pay gap.

The festival launched a sexual harassment hotline in partnership with France’s Ministry of Gender Equality where victims of harassment and abuse could receive support and guidance by calling a dedicated number.

Awards

Official awards
In Competition
 Palme d'Or: Shoplifters by Hirokazu Kore-eda
 Grand Prix: BlacKkKlansman by Spike Lee
 Best Director: Paweł Pawlikowski for Cold War
 Jury Prize: Capernaum by Nadine Labaki
 Best Screenplay:
 Alice Rohrwacher  for Happy as Lazzaro 
 Jafar Panahi and Nader Saeivar for 3 Faces
 Best Actress: Samal Yeslyamova for Ayka
 Best Actor: Marcello Fonte for Dogman
 Special Palme d'Or: The Image Book by Jean-Luc Godard

Un Certain Regard
Un Certain Regard Award: Border by Ali Abbasi
Un Certain Regard Jury Prize: The Dead and the Others by João Salaviza and Renée Nader Messora
Un Certain Regard Award for Best Director: Sergei Loznitsa for Donbass
Un Certain Regard Jury Award for Best Performance: Victor Polster for Girl
Un Certain Regard Award for Best Screenplay: Meryem Benm'Barek-Aloïsi for Sofia

Cinéfondation
 First Prize: The Summer of the Electric Lion by Diego Céspedes
 Second Prize:
 Calendar by Igor Poplauhin
 The Storms in Our Blood by Shen Di
 Third Prize: Inanimate by Lucia Bulgheroni

Golden Camera
 Caméra d'Or: Girl by Lukas Dhont

Independent awards
FIPRESCI Prizes
 In Competition: Burning by Lee Chang-dong 
 Un Certain Regard: Girl by Lukas Dhont 
 International Critics' Week: One Day by Zsófia Szilágyi

Ecumenical Prize
 Prize of the Ecumenical Jury: Capernaum by Nadine Labaki
 Special Mention:  BlacKkKlansman by Spike Lee

International Critics' Week
 Nespresso Grand Prize: Diamantino by Gabriel Abrantes and Daniel Schmidt
 Leica Cine Discovery Prize for Short Film: Hector Malot: The Last Day of the Year by Jacqueline Lentzou
 Louis Roederer Foundation Rising Star Award: Félix Maritaud for Sauvage
 Gan Foundation Award for Distribution: Sir by Rohena Gera
 SACD Award: Woman at War by Benedikt Erlingsson and Ólafur Egill Egilsson
 Canal+ Award for Short Film: A Wedding Day by Elias Belkeddar

Directors' Fortnight
 Art Cinema Award: Climax by Gaspar Noé
 SACD Award: The Trouble with You by Pierre Salvadori
 Europa Cinemas Label Award: Lucia's Grace by Gianni Zanasi
 Illy Short Film Award: Skip Day by Ivete Lucas and Patrick Bresnan
Carrosse d'Or: Martin Scorsese

L'Œil d'or
 L'Œil d'or: Samouni Road by Stefano Savona
 Special Mention:
Libre by Michel Toesca
The Eyes of Orson Welles by Mark Cousins

Queer Palm
 Queer Palm Award: Girl by Lukas Dhont
 Short Film Queer Palm: The Orphan by Carolina Markowicz

Palm Dog
 Palm Dog Award: Canine cast of Dogman
 Grand Jury Prize: Diamantino
 Palm DogManitarian Award: Vanessa Davies and her pug Patrick
 Special Jury Prize: Security dogs Lilou, Glock and Even

Prix François Chalais
 François Chalais Prize: Yomeddine by Abu Bakr Shawky

Vulcan Award  of the Technical Artist
 Vulcan Award: Shin Joom-hee for Burning (art direction)

Cannes Soundtrack Award
Cannes Soundtrack Award: Roma Zver and German Osipov for Summer

Trophée Chopard
 Chopard Trophy: Elizabeth Debicki and Joe Alwyn

References

External links
 

2018 film festivals
2018 in French cinema
2018
May 2018 events in France